Blennidus blandus is a species of ground beetle in the subfamily Pterostichinae. It was described by Wilhelm Ferdinand Erichson in 1834.

References

Blennidus
Beetles described in 1834